Felipe Yáñez may refer to:
 Felipe Yáñez (cyclist)
 Felipe Yáñez (footballer)